A balalaika is a stringed musical instrument of Russian origin.

Balalaika may also refer to:

Film
Balalaika (musical), 1936 musical play with words and lyrics by Eric Maschwitz
 Balalaika (film), a 1939 MGM musical romance film based on the 1936 musical play
 Balalayka (film), a 2000 Turkish drama directed by Ali Özgentürk and written by Işıl Özgentürk

Music
 "Balalaika" (Koharu Kusumi song), a 2006 Japanese song
 "Balalaika", a Hebrew song by Ilanit
 "Balalaika", a 2009 Romanian song by Anna Lesko
"Balleilakka", a song from Sivaji composed by A. R. Rahman
"Balle Lakka", a song from Mankatha composed by Yuvan Shankar Raja

Other
 Balalaika, a character in the Japanese manga and anime Black Lagoon
, a sports talk show hosted by Ilary Blasi and Nicola Savino with Belén Rodríguez
 An unofficial nickname for the Mikoyan-Gurevich MiG-21 Russian fighter jet, from its planform shape
 Balalaika, unofficial nickname of the bus :de:LiAZ-677
 Balalaika, Russian nickname for the Dragunov sniper rifle